Esther Warkov may refer to:
 Esther Warkov (activist)
 Esther Warkov (artist)